A by-election was held for the New South Wales Legislative Assembly electorate of Upper Hunter on 5 August 1875 as the by-election that returned Thomas Hungerford was overturned by the Election and Qualifications Committee on the basis that two polls were taken at Belltrees.

Dates

Results

The June by-election was overturned by the Election and Qualifications Committee because two polls were taken at Belltrees.

Aftermath
Thomas Hungerford also lodged a petition, in which he alleged John McElhone committed acts of bribery and corruption by supplying electors with food, drink and transport.

See also
Electoral results for the district of Upper Hunter
List of New South Wales state by-elections

References

1875 elections in Australia
New South Wales state by-elections
1870s in New South Wales